Scarthyla goinorum, also known commonly as the Madre de Dios treefrog and the Tarauaca snouted treefrog, is a species of frog in the family Hylidae. The species is endemic to South America.

Etymology
The specific name, goinorum (genitive plural), is in honor of American herpetologists Coleman J. Goin and Olive B. Goin, who were husband and wife.

Geographic range
S. goinorum is found in Bolivia, Brazil, Colombia, and Peru.

Habitat
The natural habitats of S. goinorum are subtropical or tropical moist lowland forests, rivers, and intermittent rivers.

Conservation status
S. goinorum is threatened by habitat loss.

References

Further reading
Bokermann WCA (1962). "Cuatro nuevos hylidos del Brasil (Amphibia, Salientia, Hylidae)". Neotropicas, notas zoológicas sudamericanos, Buenos Aires 8: 81–91. (Hyla goinorum, new species). (in Spanish).

goinorum
Amphibians of Bolivia
Amphibians of Brazil
Amphibians of Colombia
Amphibians of Peru
Amphibians described in 1962
Taxonomy articles created by Polbot